Constituency NA-136 (Sheikhupura-VI) was a constituency for the National Assembly of Pakistan. It was divided between areas of Nankana Sahib Tehsil and Sheikhupura Tehsil; with the major chunk being of Nankana Sahib areas. After elevation of Nankana Sahib to district level in 2005, the constituency started being referred to as "NA-136 Nankana Sahib-cum-Sheikhupura". With the 2018 delimitations, the constituency was abolished and the overlapping of the two districts was ended. Now the areas of Nankana Sahib that were in this constituency, including the towns of Warburton and Tashpur, and the Qanungo Halqas of Mangtanwala and Rahanwala, are divided between NA-117 and NA-116. Meanwhile the Sheikhupura section, which included the town of Manawala and the Qanungo Halqa of Bahrianwala are included in NA-122 and NA-120 respectively.

Election 2002 

General elections were held on 10 Oct 2002. Chaudhry Bilal Ahmed Virk of PML-Q won by 63,167 votes.

Election 2008 

General elections were held on 18 Feb 2008. Chaudhry Bilal Ahmed Virk of PML-N won by 49,681 votes.

Election 2013 

General elections were held on 11 May 2013. Chaudhry Bilal Ahmed Virk of PML-N won by 73,775 votes and became the  member of National Assembly.

References

External links 
 Election result's official website

NA-136